Dar, unde ești is the debut album of the Moldovan band O-Zone, and the only one to be released by the original lineup of the band (with only Dan Bălan and Petru Jelihovschi as members). It was released in Moldova under the Media Services label, a sub-label of Sony Music Entertainment, on September 2, 1999, and released in Romania under the same label on September 10, 2002.

Track listing
"Fiesta de la noche" Night Party
"Timpul trece fără noi" - Time Passes Without Us
"M-aș trezi" - I'd Wake Up
"Te voi iubi" - I'll Love You
"Dar, unde ești...?!" - But, Where Are You?
"Te aștept" - I'm Waiting For You
"Crede-mă" - Believe Me
"În doi" - Folded In Two
"De la mine" - From Me
"Ciao bambina" - (IT:) Bye Babe
"Oriunde-ai fi" - Wherever You Are
"În doi (negativ)"
"Surpriza de Anul Nou" - New Year's Eve Surprise

References

1999 debut albums
O-Zone albums